Serine/threonine-protein kinase PAK 2 is an enzyme that in humans is encoded by the PAK2 gene.

PAK2 is one of three members of Group I PAK family of serine/threonine kinases. The PAKs are evolutionary conserved. PAK2 and its cleaved fragment localize in both the cytoplasmic or nuclear compartments. PAK2 signaling modulates apoptosis, endothelial lumen formation, viral pathogenesis, and cancer including, breast, hepatocarcinoma, and gastric  and cancer, at-large.

Discovery 

The human PAK2 was identified as a downstream effector of Rac or Cdc42.

Gene and spliced variants 

The PAK2 gene is about 92.7-kb long. The gene contains 15 exons and generates three alternatively spliced transcripts - two of which code proteins of 524 amino acids and 221 amino acids, while the third one is a 371-bp non-coding RNA transcript(Gene from review) There are two transcripts generated from the murine PAK2 gene, a 5.7-kb transcript coding a 524 amino acids long polypeptide and a 1.2-kb long non-coding RNA transcript.

Protein domains 

Similar to PAK1, PAK2 contains a p21-binding domain (PBD) and an auto-inhibitory domain (AID) and exists in an inactive conformation.

The p21 activated kinases (PAK) are critical effectors that link Rho GTPases to cytoskeleton reorganization and nuclear signaling. The PAK proteins are a family of serine/threonine kinases that serve as targets for the small GTP binding proteins, CDC42 and RAC1, and have been implicated in a wide range of biological activities. The protein encoded by this gene is activated by proteolytic cleavage during caspase-mediated apoptosis, and may play a role in regulating the apoptotic events in the dying cell.

Function 

The p21 activated kinases (PAK) are critical effectors that link Rho GTPases to cytoskeleton reorganization and nuclear signaling. The PAK proteins are a family of serine/threonine kinases that serve as targets for the small GTP binding proteins, CDC42 and RAC1, and have been implicated in a wide range of biological activities. The protein encoded by this gene is activated by proteolytic cleavage during caspase-mediated apoptosis, and may play a role in regulating the apoptotic events in the dying cell.

Upstream activators 

PAK2 kinase activity is stimulated by transforming growth factor β in fibroblasts, by proteinase inhibitor alpha2-macroglobulin binding to GRP78 in prostate cancer cells, by its phosphorylation by AMP-activated protein kinase in stem and cancer cells  and eryptosis. PAK2 is cleaved through activated caspase-3 in fibroblast and cancer cells exposed to ultraviolet, hyperosmotic shock, and ionizing radiation.

Inhibitors 

The levels of PAK2 activation in experimental systems are inhibited by synthetic PAK-inhibitors and miRs. For example, FRAX1036 differentially inhibits PAK2 and PAK1 activities; FRAX597 suppresses PAK2 activity in neurofibromatosis type 2 (NF2)-associated tumorigenesis; and miR-23b and miR-137 inhibits PAK2 expression in tumor cells. Insulin stimulation of neuronal cells also antagonizes PAK2 kinase  activity, leading to an increased  glucose uptake.

Downstream targets 

PAK2-mediated phosphorylation of merlin at S518 modulates its tumor suppressor activity, c-Jun phosphorylation at T2, T8, T89, T93 and T286 contributes to the growth of growth factor-stimulated melanoma cells, Caspase-7 phosphorylation at S30, T173 and S239 inhibits apoptotic activity in breast cancer cells, Paxillin phosphorylation at S272 and S274 activates ADAM10 protease, and STAT5 phosphorylation at S779 modulates BCL-ABL-mediated leukemogenesis. PAK2 activity negatively regulates the function and expression of c-Myc: PAK2 phosphorylation of c-Myc at T358-S373-T400 inhibits its transactivation function  and PAK2 depletion stimulates c-Myc expression during granulocyte-monocyte lineage.

Notes

References

External links 
PAK2 Info with links in the Cell Migration Gateway